Digital 3&4 is a consortium consisting of ITV plc, STV Group plc and the Channel Four Television Corporation, which operates a multiplex broadcasting from a number of transmitter sites in the United Kingdom, carrying television and radio channels, together with interactive services, from both ITV and Channel 4. Unlike other multiplexes, the regional ITV broadcaster has control over which services are to be broadcast on their allotted amount of the capacity, leading to small regional differences across the country.

Channels carried
ITV1 / STV
ITV1 +1 / STV +1 (except Channel Islands)
ITV2
ITV3
ITV4
ITVBe
Channel 4
S4C (Wales only)
Channel 4 +1
Film4
More4
E4
E4 +1
Channel 5
Freeview Information page
Accessible TV Guide

See also
List of digital terrestrial television channels (UK)

ITV (TV network)
Channel 4